Cindy Serrano (born May 8, 1983) is a Puerto Rican professional boxer who held the WBO female featherweight title from 2016 to 2017. She also challenged for the WIBA featherweight title in 2005; the WIBA and WIBF welterweight titles in 2011; and the unified WBA and IBF female lightweight titles in 2018. Her younger sister, Amanda, is also a professional boxer. The pair became the first sisters to hold world titles from major sanctioning bodies at the same time after Cindy captured the WBO title in 2016.

Professional career
Serrano made her professional debut on September 12, 2003, scoring a four-round unanimous decision (UD) victory against Kathy Rodriguez at Dover Downs in Dover, Delaware.

After compiling a record of 12–0 (7 KOs) she faced Rhonda Luna for the vacant WIBA featherweight title on December 10, 2005, at the Turning Stone Resort Casino in Verona, New York. The bout ended in a split draw, with one judge scoring the bout 96–94 in favour of Serrano, another judge scoring it 98–92 for Luna, while the third judge scored it even at 95–95.

Following three UD victories, she faced Melissa Fiorentino for the inaugural WBC-NABF female super featherweight title on July 7, 2007, at the Joseph L. Bruno Stadium in Troy, New York. Serrano suffered the first defeat of her career, losing via eight-round UD with all three judges scoring the bout 79–73. After the fight, Serrano required 20 stitches to close a cut on her eyelid sustained in the second round.

She suffered two more UD defeats in 2018—against former world champions Layla McCarter and Jessica Rakoczy in January and April respectively—before a three-year spell out of the ring. She returned to action in June 2011, fighting to a split draw against Oxandia Castillo.

Serrano's next fight came four months later, facing WIBA and WBF female welterweight champion Anne Sophie Mathis, with the vacant WIBF title also up for grabs, on October 1 at the Salle Mermoz in Yutz, France. Serrano suffered the fourth defeat of her career, losing via shutout UD with all three judges scoring the bout 100–90.

She bounced back from defeat with three UD victories in 2012 before defeating Grecia Nova via first-round technical knockout (TKO) on May 10, 2013, capturing the lightly regarded vacant UBF female super featherweight title at the Coliseo Carlos 'Teo' Cruz in Santo Domingo, Dominican Republic.

After defeating Diana Dominguez via UD in August 2013, Serrano fought Dominguez again on May 12, 2014, capturing the vacant UBF female lightweight title via ten-round UD at the Cancha del Congo in Santiago de los Caballeros, Dominican Republic.

Following four more fights—three wins (one by TKO) and a draw—Serrano faced former world title challenger Calista Silgado for the vacant WBO female featherweight title on December 10, 2016, at the Coliseo Cosme Beitia Salamo in Cataño, Puerto Rico. Serrano captured her first major world title, defeating Silgado via majority decision (MD) over ten rounds with two judges scoring the bout 99–91 and 96–94 in favour of Serrano while the third judge scored it a draw at 95–95. With the win, Serrano and her younger sister, Amanda, became the first sisters to hold major world titles at the same time.

She made one successful defence of her WBO title, defeating Paola Torres via UD on May 13, 2017, at the Coliseo Samuel Rodriguez in Aguas Buenas, Puerto Rico. All three judges scored the bout 97–93.

After an eight-round split decision (SD) victory in a non-title fight against Edina Kiss in October 2017, Serrano moved up to lightweight to challenge former Olympic gold medalist and reigning unified WBA and IBF female champion Katie Taylor. The bout took place on October 20, 2018, at the TD Garden in Boston, Massachusetts. In what was described as a dominant performance by Taylor, Serrano suffered the sixth defeat of her career, losing by a shutout UD with all three judges scoring the bout 100–90.

Professional boxing record

References

External links

Living people
1982 births
Puerto Rican women boxers
Featherweight boxers
Super-featherweight boxers
Lightweight boxers
Welterweight boxers
World Boxing Organization champions
Southpaw boxers